Jacques Fath (6 September 1912 in Maisons-Laffitte, France – 13 November 1954 in Paris, France) was a French fashion designer who was considered one of the three dominant influences on postwar haute couture, the others being Christian Dior and Pierre Balmain. The playwright Georges Fath was his great-grandfather.

Career
The son of André Fath, an Alsatian-Flemish insurance agent, Fath came from a creative family. His paternal great-grandparents, Caroline and Georges Fath, were fashion illustrators and writers, and his paternal grandfather, Rene-Maurice Fath, was a landscape painter.

Fath presented his first collection in 1937, working out of a two-room salon on Rue de la Boetie. The studio was later moved to a second location on Rue Francois Premier in 1940 before settling into a third location at 39 Avenue Pierre-ler-de-Serbie in 1944. Among his models was Lucie Daouphars (1921 or 1922–1963), a.k.a. Lucky, a former welder who eventually became the top house model for Christian Dior.

A self-taught designer who learned his craft from studying museum exhibitions and books about fashion, Fath hired a number of young designers as assistants and apprentices, some of which later went on to form their own houses, including Hubert de Givenchy, Guy Laroche, and Valentino Garavani.

A popular and occasionally innovative designer known for dressing "the chic young Parisienne", Fath utilized such materials as hemp sacking and sequins made of walnut and almond shells. His 1950 collection was called Lily, and its skirts were shaped to resemble flowers. For eveningwear, he advocated velvet gowns. During World War II, Fath was known for "wide fluttering skirts" which, The New York Times explained, "he conceived for the benefit of women forced to ride bicycles during gasoline rationing". His clients included Ava Gardner, Greta Garbo, and Rita Hayworth, who wore a Fath dress for her wedding to Prince Aly Khan.

Jacques Fath also dressed Eva Perón. In one of the few remaining paintings of the 1940s and 1950s not destroyed by the Revolución Libertadora in 1955 (three years after Evita's death), when Perón was ousted from power,  Evita is depicted beside General Perón wearing a white evening dress designed by Fath. This same dress is showcased beside the painting on a mannequin under a protected glass cover in the Museo del Bicentenario in Buenos Aires, Argentina.

Fashion house
The Fath design house closed in 1957, three years after Fath died of leukemia, which he'd been diagnosed with in 1952. It was operated in its last days by his widow, who presented her first well-regarded collection for the fashion house in 1955 and who worked with three of her husband's former associates: Catherine Brivet (who previously had worked for Paul Poiret, Jean Patou, Pierre Balmain, Coco Chanel, and Cristóbal Balenciaga); Pierrey Metthey; and Suzanne Renoult (a fabric expert who had worked for Lucien Lelong; Elsa Schiaparelli; and Gaston Worth). After the company's haute couture operations ceased, it went into business producing perfumes, gloves, hosiery, and other accessories.

The company has produced a number of scents, including Jacques Fath L"Homme (1998), Yin (1999), Yang (1999), Fath de Fath (1953, reformulated and relaunched in 1993), Chasuble (1945), Expression (1977), Canasta (1950), Iris Gris (1946), Fath's Love (1968), and Green Water (1947 but reformulated and re-released in 1993). The fragrance license was held by L'Oréal until 1992.

Relaunched by the France Luxury Group in 1992, Jacques Fath was purchased in 1996 by the Banque Saga Group, which appointed Tom van Lingen, a Dutch designer, as its head designer. In 1997, when the company was purchased by Groupe Emmanuelle Khanh, van Lingen was replaced by Elena Nazaroff. A year later, Nazaroff was replaced by Octavio Pizarro. The firm became part of the Alliance Designers Group in 2002, which announced the hiring of young English designer Lizzie Disney to revive the fashion side of the brand. . Disney and the firm parted ways in 2004, and the company was sold again in 2006.

Marriage
Fath, who has been described by Italian journalist Bonaventuro Calora as extremely effeminate and a former lover of the French film director Léonide Moguy, married, in 1939, Geneviève Boucher. The bride was a photographer's model who had been Coco Chanel's secretary. They had one son, Philippe (born 1943). According to Fath's friend Princess Giovanna Pignatelli Aragona Cortés, Geneviève Fath, who directed the business side of her husband's firm during his lifetime, was a lesbian.

Geneviève Fath married, on 21 October 1967, a 27-year-old Turkish interior decorator, Kudret Ismaïl Talay, at Saint-Martin-des-Champs, in Yvelines, France. They later divorced.

Film career

Fath appeared in Scandal on the Champs-Élysées (1949, directed by Roger Blanc).

He designed costumes for several films:
Entre onze heures et minuit (1948, directed by Henri Decoin)
Quai des orfèvres (1947, directed by Henri-Georges Clouzot)
The Red Shoes (1948, costumes for Moira Shearer)
La minute de vérité (1952)
Genevieve (1953, costumes for Kay Kendall)
Abdullah the Great (1955)

Military service
Fath served as a gunner, second class, in the French Army. He received the Croix de Guerre with silver star and the Légion d'honneur. He also was held as a prisoner of war for a month, and was demobilized in 1940.

Death
Fath died of leukemia on 13 November 1954. Approximately 4,000 people attended his funeral at St. Pierre de Chaillot Church in Paris.

Documentary film
Fath was the subject of a 1994 documentary film by Pascal Franck called Les Folies de Fath.

References

External links

Jacques Fath Official Website

 
  Jacques Fath, Self-Taught Fashion Designer, A.G.Nauta couture, 2013-05-05.
 
Interview with Jacques Fath model Janine Pons, 1948–1950
Robert Barger and Jacques Fath collection, 1949-1952, [1973] from The Irene Lewisohn Costume Reference Library at The Costume Institute, The Metropolitan Museum of Art.

1912 births
1954 deaths
French fashion designers
Deaths from leukemia
Deaths from cancer in France
French people of Flemish descent